Japanese exonyms are the names of places in the Japanese language that differ from the name given in the place's dominant language.

Exonyms for cities outside of the East Asian cultural sphere tend to be more phonetically accurate to their endonyms than the English exonyms if the endonym is significantly different from the English exonym.

The names for nations and cities that existed before major Japanese orthographic reforms in the Meiji era usually have ateji, or kanji characters used solely to represent pronunciation. However, the use of ateji today has become far less common, as katakana has largely taken over the role of phonetically representing words of non-Sino-Japanese origin. As significant differences exist between the pronunciations of the Chinese and Japanese languages, many of the ateji terms for the exonyms of foreign, non-Sinitic terms are unrecognizable in Chinese, and likewise, since some of the ateji terms derived from Chinese, the aforementioned terms do not match the Japanese on or kun readings for the pronunciation of the given kanji.

Afghanistan

Algeria

Andorra

Argentina

Australia

Austria

Brazil

Cambodia

Chile

China 

For place names derived from the Chinese language, Japanese typically uses the kanji equivalents of the Chinese characters that make up their respective endonyms, albeit with a Sino-Japanese pronunciation called on readings. Some place names, however, also have an approximate pronunciation (or transcription) of a historical English exonym if the area is internationally well-known, such as Beijing and Hong Kong, and such transcriptions tend to be more common than the on-yomi or the Mandarin transcriptions. Most place names derived from Mandarin also have a Japanese transcription of the Mandarin pronunciation.

One detail to be noted, however, is that for the names of certain districts or areas in Hong Kong and Macau, the pronunciations of the Japanese transcriptions typically try to imitate the Cantonese pronunciation instead of the Mandarin pronunciation.

The Chinese characters for the endonyms above are simplified Chinese characters and will only appear in the table above if they differ from the kanji shinjitai (the current set of Japanese kanji). Most transcriptions above can be written either in kanji or katakana.

Czech Republic

Denmark

Egypt

Germany

Greece

Iceland

India 

Since India is home to many different languages and English is an official language in the country, Japanese exonyms are largely based on the English exonyms. The English exonyms are also familiar to many Indians.

Indonesia

Ireland

Israel

Italy 

Japanese exonyms for Italian place names are generally based on the Italian pronunciation rather than English exonyms.

Kazakhstan

Laos 
{| class="wikitable sortable"
! colspan="5" | (Raosu ({{lang|ja|老檛'}}))
|-
! rowspan="2" |English name
! rowspan="2" |Japanese name
! colspan="2" |Endonym
! rowspan="2" |Notes
|-
!Name
!Language
|-
|Luang Prabang
|
|Luangphabang (ຫລວງພະບາງ, ຫຼວງພະບາງ)
|Lao
|Exonym based on actual Lao pronunciation rather than spelling
|-
|Vientiane
|
|Viangchan (ວຽງຈັນ)
|Lao
|Exonym based on English pronunciation
|}

 Liechtenstein 

 Malaysia 

 Mexico 

 Myanmar 

 Netherlands 

 New Zealand 

 North Korea 

 Norway 

 Pakistan 

 Philippines 

 Poland 

 Portugal 

 Russia 

 Saudi Arabia 

 South Africa 

 South Korea 

Many place names in Korea have at least two of the pronunciations, the first being based on the Japanese on-yomi or kun-yomi and the second being based on the Korean endonym, with the latter being made so that the Japanese could navigate and ask for directions more clearly to native Koreans. Korean-based pronunciations are usually written in katakana.

 Spain 

 Sweden 

 Switzerland 

 Taiwan 

Similar to Chinese exonyms, Japanese can either use a transcription based on Mandarin or the Japanese on-yomi of the endonym. However, there are some Japanese place names that are unrelated to the Chinese name of the place, but are actually based on the Taiwanese aboriginal languages.

 Thailand 

 Turkey 

 United Arab Emirates 

 United Kingdom 

 United States 

 Vietnam 

 See also 

 Exonym and endonym
 Names of Asian cities in different languages
 Japanese place names
 List of Japanese prefectural name etymologies

References

Nelson, Andrew N. (1962) The Modern Reader's Japanese-English Character Dictionary'' (Rutland, VT: Charles E. Tuttle Company)

External links 
 List of countries in Ateji

Japanese language
Japanese culture-related lists
Transliteration
Japanese names
Japanese